Wyoming Township is a township in Jones County, Iowa.

History
Wyoming Township was organized in 1854; it was originally called Pierce Township.

References

Populated places in Jones County, Iowa
Townships in Iowa